Nik Weston is a DJ, music producer, record label owner of Mukatsuku Records and music buyer for Juno Records. Based out of London, UK, he was from the late 1990s to 2007 a key player in the promotion and distribution of Japanese recording artists and their releases outside of the country, as part of the late 1990s into 2000s revival in the jazz dance, soul-jazz and electronic Japanese music scene. He is a keen advocate of the vinyl record format.

Career
Nik Weston first entered the London dance music scene in 1994, when he started the club night Phony. He and two other friends then started a club night in Soho called Mukatsuku in 1997. It ran for 2 years from 1997 - 1999  upstairs at two floor room Club in London China Town called The Clinic, and was nominated by London Evening Standard Newspaper as 'club night of the year'.

He started the label Mukatsuku Records in 2006 after DJing as part of the Mukatsuku Crew since 1997. Weston started up a promotional company called Mukatsuku PR in 2001, doing consulting and promotion for labels such as Verve Records, Impulse, Sonar Kollektiv, Schema Records, and Ricky Tick amongst others.

As a DJ, he's played over 30 countries and supported Gilles Peterson, Jazzanova, and others. Since 2001 Weston has put out over 100 releases on various labels in the US, Europe and Japan,  and over 80 releases on his own Mukatsuku Records.

Discography

Production credits

DJ mixes
The following releases Weston compiled and/or did the DJ mix as a presenter, sometimes also handling A&R.
2003: Nik Weston Presents – Sakura Aural Bliss (Kriztal Entertainment)
2004: Various – Exceptionally Remixed (Exceptional Records)
2004: Various – The Sound Of Club Brasil Vol. 1 (Club Brasil)
2005: Various – The Sound Of Club Brasil Vol. 2 (Club Brasil)
2005: Various – Nu[new] Style Vol. 3 - Living In The Music: Nik Weston (Nuro)
2006: Routine Jazz Presents – Diggin For Gems (Routine Records)
2007: Nik Weston presents Jabberloop – Ugetsu (Mukatsuku Records)
2007: Nik Weston presents West/Rock/Woods – Love Cats (Mukatsuku Records)
2007: Nik Weston presents Hanna & Beatr8 – Better Than Nothing (Mukatsuku Records)
2007: Nik Weston presents Guynamite – Guynamite (Mukatsuku Records)
2008: Nik Weston presents Guynamite – Guynamite EP 02 (Mukatsuku Records)
2008: Nik Weston presents The Funky Instrumentals 45 – Volume Two (Mukatsuku Records)
2008: Nik Weston presents Gagle – The Funky Instrumentals Volume Three (Mukatsuku Records)
2008: Nik Weston presents Big Horns Bee / Big Bang – The Big 7 Inch (Mukatsuku Records)
2009: Nik Weston presents Grant Green / Orquesta De La Luz – Funky Instrumentals Volume Four (Mukatsuku Records)
2009: Nik Weston presents j.a.m / Jazztronik – Japanese Jazz With Attitude (Mukatsuku Records)
2009: Nik Weston presents Kaleta & Akoya Afrobeat – The Spirit Of Fela Is Alive And Well! (Mukatsuku Records)
2009: Nik Weston presents Guynamite – Born In '82 EP (Mukatsuku Records)
2009: Nik Weston presents Jazztronik – Disco Boogie (Mukatsuku Records)
2010: Nik Weston presents Hundred Strong Ft. Amp Fiddler Vs Guynamukat – Stylin' Free EP (Guynamukat Remixes)  (Mukatsuku Records)
2011: Nik Weston presents Mixed Grill – Brand New Wayo - Nigerian Afro Funk Boogie Badness (Mukatsuku Records)
2012: Nik Weston presents Afro Funk Gems – Volume 1: Music Of West Africa (Mukatsuku Records)
2012: Nik Weston presents Afro Funk Gems – Volume 2: Music Of West Africa (Mukatsuku Records)
2012: Nik Weston presents Wganda Kenya & M'Bamina – Afro Funk Gems Volume Three (Mukatsuku Records)
2013: Nik Weston presents African Souls Band / Wganda Kenya – Afro Funk Gems Volume Four (Mukatsuku Records)
2013: Nik Weston presents Guynamukat – Archway Riviera Tropical Jam EP (Mukatsuku Records)
2013: Nik Weston presents Wganda Kenya/ Fruko Y Sus Tesos – Colombian Funk & Latin Gems 45 (Mukatsuku Records)
2014: Nik Weston presents Guynamukat Vs Eufoquestra – Ogun EP (Mukatsuku Records)
2014: Nik Weston presents Marcia Hines / Jackie Wilson – Lost Soul & Funk Gems Vol 1 (Mukatsuku Records) 
2014: Nik Weston presents Orlando Julius And His Afro Sounders – James Brown Rides On (Mukatsuku Records) 
2014: Nik Weston presents Loleatta Hollway/Ron Henderson And Choice Of Colour – Lost Soul & Funk Gems Vol 2 (Mukatsuku Records)
2014: Nik Weston presents Marco Di Marco/ Jazz Collective – Two Sides Of Club Jazz (Mukatsuku Records)
2015: Nik Weston presents Jo Togo/Sookie – Afro Funk Gems Vol Five (Mukatsuku Records)
2015: Nik Weston presents Sharon Revoal/Swan Silvertones – Soulful Funk & Gospel Soul (Mukatsuku Records)
2015: Nik Weston presents The Chapparrals/The Diddys – Lost Funk Soul & Disco Gems Volume Three (Mukatsuku Records)
2015: Nik Weston presents Courtial/Sounds Of The City Experience – Lost Soul & Funk Gems Volume Four (Mukatsuku Records)
2016: Nik Weston presents Rim & Kasa/Rim Kwaku Obeng – Mukatsuku Vs BBE Official Edits (Mukatsuku Records)
2016: Nik Weston presents Estiban – Lost Funk & Disco Gems Volume Five (Mukatsuku Records)

A&R
2016: Marius Cultier / Dimenzio – Two Sides Of Club Jazz – Hungary Vs France (Mukatsuku Records)
2016: Poets Of Rhythm / Wallace Brothers – Funk Monsters Vol One (Mukatsuku Records)
2016: Mavis John / Guy Benton & Nik Weston – Trinidad Funk Vs Archway Riviera (Mukatsuku Records)
2016: Ojeda Penn – Lost Funk & Disco Gems Volume Six (Mukatsuku Records)
2016: Roy Ayers – Funk & Soulful Side Of Roy Ayers (Mukatsuku Records)
2016: Suzy Brown / Anne & Anice Peters – Reggae Disco Special (Mukatsuku Records)
2016: Pearl Dowdell / Billy Cee & Freedom Express – Funk Monsters Volume Two (Mukatsuku Records)
2016: Three Pieces / Johnny Hammond – Mukatsuku Presents On First Time On A 45 Classics Volume One (Mukatsuku Records)
2016: Billy Hawks – Two Sides Of Funky Club Jazz Volume Three – Mod Jazz Edition (Mukatsuku Records)

Mukatsuku Records

Mukatsuku Records is a record label started by Nik Weston in 2006, based out of London, UK. The label's general style of music is soul/funk/jazz/disco related and defined as dance music and/or black music of various origins. Many of the early releases were part of the jazz dance scene. Often, though not always, the music has a focus on Japanese recording artists. Mukatsuku Records releases all of its music on vinyl and releases neither albums nor digital content.

History
British DJ Nik Weston and two other friends started a club night in Soho, London called Mukatsuku in 1997. It ran for 2 years from 1997–1999 in an upstairs two floor room club in London China Town called "The Clinic", and were nominated by London Evening Standard Newspaper as 'club night of the year'. According to Weston, the name Mukatsuku translates in Japanese 'to feel sick, irritated or offended', and was picked as a subtle jibe at an acquaintance's use of the word as a catchphrase.

While A&Ring for Exceptional Records, Weston realized it was difficult to sign artists for single releases, so he endeavoured to start a vinyl-only, singles-only label. The label has since put out English, Japanese, Scandinavian and even New Zealand tracks. According to JellyJazz, "The Mukatsuku label is one of the best selling independent vinyls labels in the UK, and it is ONLY vinyls."

Catalogue

See also
List of independent UK record labels

References

External links

Mukatsuku Records at Facebook
Mukatsuku Records at Juno Records store
Mukatsuku Records at SoundCloud
Mukatsuku Records at Twitter

Living people
British record labels
Record labels established in 2006
Indie rock record labels
Year of birth missing (living people)